Heiligenberg is a commune in the Bas-Rhin department in Grand Est in north-eastern France. Its name means mountain of the saints in German.

Geography
The village is positioned approximately ten kilometres (six miles) to the west of Molsheim, on high ground overlooking the Bruche valley.   To the west is the great domainal forest of Haslach.

Unusually in Alsace, this is one village not traversed by a numbered departmental road:  it does, however, overlook the former Route Nationale N420 in the valley below, a long distance road rendered less important in recent years by the development of the autoroute network: in 2006 this stretch of road was formally downgraded to become the Route Departmentale RD 420.

History
The villagers rescued the mail and the crew of a Montgolfier balloon after it escaped the Siege of Paris on October 25, 1870.   The balloon's anchor has been kept.

See also
 Communes of the Bas-Rhin department

References

Communes of Bas-Rhin
Bas-Rhin communes articles needing translation from French Wikipedia